The Pietrosul ( or Köves-Somlyó-patak;) is a left tributary of the Mureș in Romania. It flows into the Mureș between Joseni and Remetea.

References

Rivers of Romania
Rivers of Harghita County